Jenő Rejtő (29 March 1905 – 1 January 1943) was a Hungarian journalist, pulp fiction writer and playwright who died as a forced labourer during World War II. He was born in Budapest, Austria-Hungary, on 29 March 1905, and died in Evdakovo, Voronezh Oblast, Soviet Union (then under Axis occupation) on 1 January 1943. Despite the "pulp" nature of his writings, he is not only widely read in Hungary, but is also much appreciated by literary critics. It is a prevalent opinion that he lifted the genre to the level of serious art, and his works will long outlive him.

Biography
Jenő Rejtő completed his studies in a drama school in 1924, after which he travelled extensively throughout Europe. Returning to Hungary, he made his living as a playwright, often with great success, such as with his operetta, Aki mer, az nyer (Who Dares Wins, 1934).

Later, he started to write adventure novels based on his trips and experiences abroad. His novels were raised above mediocrity by his inimitable and bizarre sense of humour. His novels parodying the French Foreign Legion, written under the pseudonym P. Howard, reaped the greatest success. He also wrote a large number of cabaret farces and edited a newspaper, Nagykörút, which, however, was published just once. His most appreciated novels are stories unifying elements from detective novels and romance, always including a unique sense of humour. He also wrote novels in the tradition of American Westerns.

Starting in 1939, he could not publish his novels any more under his own name because of his Jewish origins. On 9 October 1942, an article in the Nazi Arrow Cross Party’s newspaper (Egyedül Vagyunk [We Are Alone]) exposed Rejtő as a Jew and reported that he was seen writing calmly in Budapest cafés while evading the labour service draft that was compulsory for Jewish men of military age (they were forbidden to perform arm-bearing service in the military). He was seriously ill by this time but was taken by force from hospital to do his labour service on the eastern front, into the Soviet Union, where he shortly died of typhus.

Legacy
In the early years of communism his works were only available on the black market as pre-war editions, but from the 1960s on, his novels were republished, and they gained instant popularity in Hungary (then still under communist rule). They elicit a cult following to this day. Some of his works have been made into films and comic books. Rejtő’s comic book adaptations by Pál Korcsmáros (1916-1975) are regarded as classics in their own right in Hungary. While a writer, he was a regular customer at the Cafe Japan (Japán kávéház) in Budapest, which was near Nova, his publisher. He paid for his coffee with lines written on napkins, which in turn were taken to Nova, where they were purchased and collated.

Rejtő's memory is kept alive in Budapest in various ways: in 2001 a street was named after him, while in 2003 there was an exhibition dedicated to him in the Petőfi Museum of Literature (Petőfi Irodalmi Múzeum). In 2005 his picture appeared on a Hungarian postage stamp, part of the series "Great Hungarians", and there is an initiative to erect his statue in Budapest.

Works
The original Hungarian editions of Rejtő's numerous works—the most famous of which are his Foreign Legion books and his "Dirty Fred" series—were already in the public domain in the 1990s. However, since Hungary implemented the EU copyright extension retroactively in 1999, Rejtő's works became again subject to copyright when sold in EU countries (but not in other countries); they entered the public domain everywhere on 1 January 2014 (70 years after the next 1 January following the author's death).

English translations of some of his works are available online:

 A tizennégy karátos autó (The 14-Carat Roadster)
 A szőke ciklon (The Blonde Hurricane)
 Az elsikkasztott pénztáros (The Embezzled Bank Teller)

Other works (selection)

 Az elveszett cirkáló (The Vanished Cruiser)
 A megkerült cirkáló (The Found Cruiser)
 Piszkos Fred, a kapitány (Captain Dirty Fred)
 Piszkos Fred visszavág (Dirty Fred Strikes Back)
 Az elátkozott part (The Cursed Shore)
 A három testőr Afrikában (The Three Musketeers in Africa)
 Csontbrigád (Bone Brigade)
 Vesztegzár a Grand Hotelben (Quarantine at the Grand Hotel), Budapest: Corvina, 2009, 
 A láthatatlan légió (The Invisible Legion)
 Az ellopott futár (The Stolen Courier)
 Texas Bill, a fenegyerek (Texas Bill, the Daredevil)
 Pokol a hegyek között (Hell among the Hills)
 Megyek Párizsba ahol még nem haldokoltam (I'll go to Paris, where I've never been dying)

References 

Hungarian male novelists
Hungarian science fiction writers
Hungarian Jews
Writers from Budapest
1905 births
1943 deaths
Pulp fiction writers
20th-century Hungarian novelists
Deaths from typhus
20th-century Hungarian male writers
Hungarian World War II forced labourers
Hungarian civilians killed in World War II
Hungarian Jews who died in the Holocaust